J. Suzanne Frank is an American author, novelist and a former newspaper and magazine journalist.

A "third culture kid", she grew up in Europe, England, and the United States. She has traveled extensively in Egypt, Greece, and Israel for research. She is a resident of Texas and lives in Dallas.

She is the author of the history quartet: Reflections in the Nile, Shadows on the Aegean, Sunrise on the Mediterranean, and Twilight in Babylon, all time travel stories featuring 20th century heroine Chloe Kingsley and her time traveling husband Cheftu as they move through and influence pivotal points in Western civilization's recorded history. Frank also wrote a series of light mysteries featuring fashion stylist and amateur sleuth Dallas O'Connor. In 2013, she published Laws of Migration, the first of a contemporary series about three female ornithologists and their intersecting lives and choices. She is currently working on the second quartet featuring Chloe and Cheftu.

Since 2005, Frank has taught adults how to write novels through The Writer's Path at SMU, where she is currently the program director.

In 2018, she began her own branded Destination: Writing Workshop series, in Le Marche, Italy.

Novels
 Reflections on the Nile
 Shadows on the Aegean
 Sunrise on the Mediterranean
 Twilight in Babylon

Novels as Chloe Green

 Going Out in Style
 Designed to Die
 Fashion Victim

References

External links
 http://books.ofearna.us/frank.html

20th-century American novelists
21st-century American novelists
American mystery writers
American fantasy writers
American women novelists
Novelists from Texas
Living people
Year of birth missing (living people)
American women journalists
Women science fiction and fantasy writers
Women mystery writers
20th-century American women writers
21st-century American women writers
20th-century American non-fiction writers
21st-century American non-fiction writers